Breze may refer to:

 Breže, Ribnica, settlement in the Municipality of Ribnica in southern Slovenia
 Brézé, commune in the Maine-et-Loire department in western France
 Breze, Tuzla, a village in Bosnia and Herzegovina
 Breze, Sofia Province, village in Bulgaria
 Breze, Smolyan Province, village in Bulgaria
 Breze, old name of Šentrupert, Laško
 Brézé (surname)